Lincoln Public Schools was founded in 1923, and is the second largest public school district in the U.S. state of Nebraska, located in the heart of the Great Plains. The school district of over 40,000 students is home to more than 60 schools and programs.

The current superintendent is Dr. Paul Gausman, who joined LPS on July 1, 2022. He previously was the superintendent for Sioux City Community School District for fourteen years. Dr. Gausman holds degrees from the University of St. Thomas, the University of Sioux Falls, the University of Nebraska-Omaha, and from the University of Nebraska-Lincoln.

As of 2010, students of Lincoln Public Schools speak 52 languages; largely due to Lincoln being a destination of many refugees, who have settled there since the U.S. Government declared Lincoln a refugee-friendly city in the 1970s.

The district includes almost all of the Lincoln city limits, all of Yankee Hill, and portions of Cheney and Emerald.

English Language Learners
At Lincoln Public Schools, during the 2018–19 school year, the English Language Learners (ELL) program had 2,962 students from approximately 150 countries, who spoke approximately 125 different languages. Some of the most common first-languages spoken within the program are Arabic, Chinese, French, Karen, Kurdish, Nuer, Russian, Spanish, Ukrainian and Vietnamese. The top two first-language groups, as of 2018–19 school year, are Arabic and Kurdish speakers (38.4%), and Spanish speakers (25.2%). From the 2010–11 to the 2018–19 school years, LPS saw Arabic and Kurdish ELL students increase by over 196%, from 321 Arabic and 63 Kurdish speaking students to 605 Arabic and 532 Kurdish speaking students. The continually increasing influx of refugees and immigrants to Lincoln over recent years, which has included refugees/immigrants from Iraq, Mexico, Burma and refugee camps in Thailand, has caused LPS to hire additional ELL teachers at an increasingly rapid pace.  However, due to recent immigration restrictions on the national level, ELL numbers have been declining somewhat since 2018.

Music literacy
Music literacy in Lincoln begins early with Lincoln Public School music programs that provide children with the opportunity to begin strings in 4th grade and band in the 5th grade. Collaboration between the University of Nebraska at Lincoln and LPS provides children in the 3rd grade with weekly instruction in classical strings. These programs and others are supported by music retail stores within the city.

Schools

Elementary schools

Middle schools

High schools

References

External links

 LPS homepage
 Lincoln Youth Symphony

School districts in Nebraska
Education in Lincoln, Nebraska
School districts established in 1923